Posyolok imeni 8 Marta is a rural locality (a settlement) in Kolyvansky Selsoviet, Kuryinsky District, Altai Krai, Russia. The population was 152 as of 2013. There are 4 streets.

Geography 
Posyolok imeni 8 Marta is located 58 km southeast of Kurya (the district's administrative centre) by road. Kolyvan is the nearest rural locality.

References 

Rural localities in Kuryinsky District